Jerry L. Smith (December 6, 1943 – January 30, 2015) was an American lawyer and politician.

Born in Muskogee, Oklahoma, Smith graduated from Central High School in 1961. He received his bachelor's degree from Oklahoma State University and then received his law degree from University of Tulsa College of Law. He practiced law in Tulsa, Oklahoma. Smith served in the Oklahoma House of Representatives from 1972 to 1980. He then served in the Oklahoma State Senate from 1980 until 2004 and was a Republican.

Notes

1943 births
2015 deaths
Politicians from Muskogee, Oklahoma
Politicians from Tulsa, Oklahoma
Oklahoma State University alumni
University of Tulsa College of Law alumni
Oklahoma lawyers
Republican Party Oklahoma state senators
Republican Party members of the Oklahoma House of Representatives
Lawyers from Tulsa, Oklahoma
20th-century American lawyers